The Algeria national under-15 football team is the national under-15 football team of Algeria and is controlled by the Algerian Football Federation. The team competes in the UNAF U-15 Tournament.

Honours
UNAF U-15 Tournament:
Runners-up (3): Apr 2018, Nov 2018, 2019

Tournament Records

Youth Olympic Games record

UNAF U-15 Tournament record

References

External links 
 Algerian Football Association - Official site

African national under-15 association football teams
under-15
Youth football in Algeria